The following outline is provided as an overview of and topical guide to Ireland:

Ireland is a sovereign island nation located in Northern Europe. The modern Irish state occupies five-sixths of the island of Ireland, which was partitioned in 1921. It is bordered by Northern Ireland (part of the United Kingdom) to the north, by the Atlantic Ocean to the west and by the Irish Sea to the east. According to the Constitution of Ireland, "Ireland" is the official English language name of the state. In 1949, the term "Republic of Ireland" was adopted as an English language description of the State.

Ireland is one of the richest, most developed and peaceful countries on earth, having the fifth highest gross domestic product per capita, second highest gross domestic product (purchasing power parity) per capita and having the fifth highest Human Development Index rank. The country also has the highest quality of life in the world, ranking first in the Economist Intelligence Unit's Quality-of-life index. Ireland was ranked fourth on the Global Peace Index. Ireland also has high rankings for its education system, political freedom and civil rights, press freedom and economic freedom; it was also ranked fourth from the bottom on the Failed States Index, being one of the few "sustainable" states in the world.

Ireland is a member of the EU, the OECD and the UN. Ireland's policy of neutrality means it is not a member of NATO. Ireland's population is the fastest growing in Europe, with an annual growth rate of 2.5%.

Note that many geographic and cultural articles on Ireland consider the island of Ireland as a whole, including Northern Ireland, which is part of the United Kingdom.  Where no distinct article for the Irish state is available, this outline gives the relevant article for the entire island.

General reference 

 Pronunciation: 
 Common English country name: Ireland
 Official English country name: Ireland
 Common endonym(s): Éire, Ireland
 Official endonym(s): Éire, Ireland
 Adjectival(s): Irish  
 Demonym(s): Irish
 Etymology: Name of Ireland
 International rankings of Ireland
 120th largest country
 122nd most populous country
 ISO country codes:  IE, IRL, 372
 ISO region codes:  See ISO 3166-2:IE
 Internet country code top-level domain:  .ie

Geography of Ireland 

Geography of Ireland
 Ireland is: a country, on an island
 Location:
 Northern Hemisphere and Western Hemisphere
 Atlantic Ocean
 Eurasia
 Europe
 Northern Europe
 Western Europe
 British Isles
 Ireland (the island)
Ireland (the sovereign state)
Northern Ireland
 Time zone:  Western European Time (UTC+00), Irish Standard Time = Western European Summer Time (UTC+01)
 Extreme points of Ireland
 High:  Carrauntoohil 
 Low:  North Atlantic Ocean 0 m
 Land boundaries:   360 km
 Coastline:  1,448 km
 Population: 4,581,269 people (2011 census) – 119th most populous country
 Area:   – 120th largest country
 Atlas of Ireland

Environment of Ireland 

 Climate of Ireland
 Environmental issues in Ireland
 Renewable energy in Ireland
 Geology of Ireland
 Protected areas of Ireland
 Biosphere reserves in Ireland: North Bull Island, Killarney National Park
 National parks of Ireland
 Fauna of Ireland
 Flora of Ireland
 Fauna of Ireland
 Birds of Ireland
 Mammals of Ireland

Natural geographic features of Ireland 
 Islands of Ireland
 Mountains of Ireland
 Valleys of Ireland
 Rivers of Ireland
 Waterfalls of Ireland
 Lakes of Ireland
 World Heritage Sites in Ireland

Regions of Ireland 
List of regions of the Republic of Ireland
Regional Assemblies in Ireland
Provinces of Ireland (including Northern Ireland)

Administrative divisions of Ireland 
Local government in the Republic of Ireland
 Counties of Ireland
 Municipalities of Ireland

Counties of Ireland 
Counties of Ireland
The counties of the Republic of Ireland:
 County Carlow
 County Cavan
 County Clare
 County Cork
 County Donegal
 County Dublin
 County Galway
 County Kerry
 County Kildare
 County Kilkenny
 County Laois
 County Leitrim
 County Limerick
 County Longford
 County Louth
 County Mayo
 County Meath
 County Monaghan
 County Offaly
 County Roscommon
 County Sligo
 County Tipperary
 County Waterford
 County Westmeath
 County Wexford
 County Wicklow

The counties arranged in other ways:
 List of Irish counties by population
 List of Irish counties by area

Municipalities of Ireland 
Municipalities of Ireland
 Cities of Ireland
 Capital of Ireland: Dublin

Demography of Ireland 

Demographics of the Republic of Ireland

Government and politics of Ireland 

 Form of government: parliamentary representative democratic republic
 Capital of Ireland: Dublin
 Elections in the Republic of Ireland
 Political parties in Ireland
 Political scandals of Ireland
 Taxation in Ireland

Branches of the government of Ireland 

Government of Ireland

Executive branch of the government of Ireland 
 Head of state: President of Ireland, Michael D. Higgins
 Head of government: Taoiseach (Prime Minister), Leo Varadkar
 Tánaiste (Deputy Prime Minister), Micheál Martin
 Government of Ireland
 Minister for Agriculture, Food and the Marine
 Minister for Children, Equality, Disability, Integration and Youth
 Minister for Defence
 Minister for Education
 Minister for Enterprise, Trade and Employment
 Minister for the Environment, Climate and Communications
 Minister for Finance
 Minister for Foreign Affairs
 Minister for Further and Higher Education, Research, Innovation and Science
 Minister for Health
 Minister for Housing, Local Government and Heritage
 Minister for Justice
 Minister for Public Expenditure, National Development Plan Delivery and Reform
 Minister for Rural and Community Development
 Minister for Social Protection
 Minister for Tourism, Culture, Arts, Gaeltacht, Sport and Media
 Minister for Transport
 State-sponsored bodies of the Republic of Ireland
 Civil service of the Republic of Ireland

Legislative branch of the government of Ireland 
 Oireachtas (bicameral parliament)
 The President of Ireland
 The two Houses of the Oireachtas:
 Upper house: Seanad Éireann
 Lower house: Dáil Éireann

Judicial branch of the government of Ireland 

 Supreme Court of Ireland
 Court of Appeal
 High Court of Ireland
 Special Criminal Court
 District Court
 Circuit Court

Foreign relations of Ireland 

 Diplomatic missions in Ireland
 Diplomatic missions of Ireland
 Ireland–United Kingdom relations

International organisation membership 

International organization membership of Ireland
Ireland is a member of:

Asian Development Bank (ADB) (nonregional member)
Australia Group
Bank for International Settlements (BIS)
British-Irish Council (BIC)
Council of Europe (CE)
Economic and Monetary Union (EMU)
Euro-Atlantic Partnership Council (EAPC)
European Bank for Reconstruction and Development (EBRD)
European Investment Bank (EIB)
European Space Agency (ESA)
European Union (EU)
Food and Agriculture Organization (FAO)
International Atomic Energy Agency (IAEA)
International Bank for Reconstruction and Development (IBRD)
International Chamber of Commerce (ICC)
International Civil Aviation Organization (ICAO)
International Criminal Court (ICCt)
International Criminal Police Organization (Interpol)
International Development Association (IDA)
International Energy Agency (IEA)
International Federation of Red Cross and Red Crescent Societies (IFRCS)
International Finance Corporation (IFC)
International Fund for Agricultural Development (IFAD)
International Hydrographic Organization (IHO)
International Labour Organization (ILO)
International Maritime Organization (IMO)
International Monetary Fund (IMF)
International Olympic Committee (IOC)
International Organization for Migration (IOM)
International Organization for Standardization (ISO)
International Red Cross and Red Crescent Movement (ICRM)
International Telecommunication Union (ITU)
International Telecommunications Satellite Organization (ITSO)

International Trade Union Confederation (ITUC)
Inter-Parliamentary Union (IPU)
Multilateral Investment Guarantee Agency (MIGA)
Nuclear Energy Agency (NEA)
Nuclear Suppliers Group (NSG)
Organisation for Economic Co-operation and Development (OECD)
Organization for Security and Cooperation in Europe (OSCE)
Organisation for the Prohibition of Chemical Weapons (OPCW)
Organization of American States (OAS) (observer)
Paris Club
Partnership for Peace (PFP)
Permanent Court of Arbitration (PCA)
United Nations (UN)
United Nations Conference on Trade and Development (UNCTAD)
United Nations Educational, Scientific, and Cultural Organization (UNESCO)
United Nations High Commissioner for Refugees (UNHCR)
United Nations Industrial Development Organization (UNIDO)
United Nations Interim Force in Lebanon (UNIFIL)
United Nations Mission for the Referendum in Western Sahara (MINURSO)
United Nations Mission in Liberia (UNMIL)
United Nations Operation in Cote d'Ivoire (UNOCI)
United Nations Organization Mission in the Democratic Republic of the Congo (MONUC)
United Nations Truce Supervision Organization (UNTSO)
Universal Postal Union (UPU)
Western European Union (WEU) (observer)
World Customs Organization (WCO)
World Federation of Trade Unions (WFTU)
World Health Organization (WHO)
World Intellectual Property Organization (WIPO)
World Meteorological Organization (WMO)
World Trade Organization (WTO)
Zangger Committee (ZC)

Law and order in Ireland 

 Capital punishment in Ireland
 Constitution of Ireland
 Crime in Ireland
 Human rights in Ireland
 LGBT rights in the Republic of Ireland
 Freedom of religion in Ireland
 Law enforcement in Ireland
 National law enforcement agencies
 Airport Police
 Garda Síochána (National police force)
 Garda Síochána Reserve
 Local law enforcement agencies
 Dublin Harbour Police
 Dún Laoghaire Harbour Police

Military of Ireland 

 Command
 Supreme Commander of the Defence Forces: President of Ireland, Michael D. Higgins
 Irish Department of Defence
 Forces
Permanent Defence Forces
 Irish Army
 Naval Service
 Irish Air Force
 Special forces
Reserve Defence Forces
Army Reserve (formerly )
Naval Service Reserve (formerly )
Military Police
 Military history of Ireland
 Military ranks of Ireland

Local government in Ireland 
Local government in the Republic of Ireland

History of Ireland 
 History of Ireland (including Northern Ireland)
 History of the Republic of Ireland
 Timeline of the history of Ireland
 Current events of Ireland
 Military history of Ireland

Culture of Ireland 

 Architecture of Ireland
 Cuisine of Ireland
 Festivals in Ireland
 Languages of Ireland
 Media of the Republic of Ireland

 Coat of arms of Ireland
 Flag of Ireland
 Coat of arms of Ireland
 National anthem of Ireland: Amhrán na bhFiann
 People of Ireland
 Prostitution in Ireland
 Public holidays in Ireland
 Records of Ireland
 Religion in the Republic of Ireland
 Christianity in Ireland
 Hinduism in the Republic of Ireland
 Islam in Ireland
 Ahmadiyya in Ireland
 Judaism in Ireland
 Sikhism in Ireland
 World Heritage Sites in Ireland

Art in Ireland 
 Art in Ireland
 Cinema of Ireland
 Literature of Ireland
 Music of Ireland
 Television in Ireland
 Theatre in Ireland

Sports in Ireland 

 Association football in the Republic of Ireland
 Gaelic football
 Rugby league in Ireland
 Rugby union in Ireland
 Hurling

Economy and infrastructure of Ireland 

 Economic rank, by nominal GDP (2007): 32nd (thirty-second)
 Agriculture in Ireland
 Banking in Ireland
 Central Bank of Ireland
 Communications in Ireland
 Internet in Ireland
 Companies of Ireland
Currency of Ireland: Euro (see also: Euro topics)
ISO 4217: EUR
 Economic history of Ireland
 Energy in Ireland
 Energy policy of Ireland
 Oil industry in Ireland
 Health care in Ireland
 Mining in Ireland
 Irish Stock Exchange
 Tourism in Ireland
 Transport in Ireland
 Airports in Ireland
 Rail transport in Ireland
 Roads in Ireland
 Startups and Entrepreneurship in Ireland
 Water supply and sanitation in the Republic of Ireland

Education in Ireland 

 List of schools in the Republic of Ireland
 List of schools in County Dublin
 List of higher education institutions in the Republic of Ireland

See also

Republic of Ireland
Island of Ireland
List of international rankings
List of Ireland-related topics
Member state of the European Union
Member state of the United Nations
Outline of Europe
Outline of geography

References

External links

  – Website of the President of Ireland
 Information on the Irish State – Governmental portal
 Ireland Story – History, geography and current affairs
 Chief Herald of Ireland – Flags, Seals, Titles
 Myths of British ancestry
 Taoiseach – Website of the Taoiseach (prime minister)
 Tithe an Oireachtais – Website of the Oireachtas (the Houses of Parliament)
 2004 Presidency of the Council of the European Union

 
 1
Ireland